Mohammad Asheri (born 21 June 1975) is an Iranian boxer. He competed in the men's lightweight event at the 2004 Summer Olympics.

References

External links
 

1975 births
Living people
Iranian male boxers
Olympic boxers of Iran
Boxers at the 2004 Summer Olympics
Place of birth missing (living people)
Lightweight boxers